Hemat Akhundzada is an Afghan  politician and member of the Taliban. He served as acting education minister of the Islamic Emirate of Afghanistan from 23 August to 7 September 2021.

References 

Living people
Taliban leaders
Year of birth missing (living people)